Thomas & Friends is a children's television series about the engines and other characters on the railways of the Island of Sodor, and is based on The Railway Series books written by the Reverend W. Awdry.

This article lists and details episodes from the 24th and last or final series of the show, which premiered on 2 May 2020 in the United Kingdom, and 1 September 2020 in the United States on Netflix. 

The series consists of 20 regular episodes as well as three half-hour specials: "A New Arrival", "World of Tomorrow", and "Thomas and the Royal Engine". The first two form a movie entitled "Marvelous Machinery”, while the latter is a celebratory episode commemorating the 75th anniversary of the original books.

As the "Big World! Big Adventures!" rebrand of the show was deemed a failure, Series 24 became the last series of the original Thomas & Friends series, with the next series retooled into Thomas & Friends: All Engines Go, a complete reboot of the series.

Voice cast

 John Hasler as Thomas (UK) 
 Joseph May as Thomas (US)
 Federico Trujillo as Raul and Marcio
 Monica Lopera as Gabriela
 Laura Cucurullo as Cassia and Marcia
 Francisco Labbe as Gustavo 
 Keith Wickham as Gordon (UK), Henry (UK), Edward (UK), Harvey, Salty, Skarloey, Sir Handel, Bert, Bertie, Harold (UK), Sir Topham Hatt, Mr. Percival (UK), Dowager Hatt, and Albert the workman
 Kerry Shale as Gordon (US), Henry (US), Diesel (UK/US), the Troublesome Trucks, Harold (US), and Mr. Percival (US)
 Teresa Gallagher as Emily (UK), Belle, Annie and Clarabel, Stephen Hatt, Bridget Hatt, the School children, some Passengers, and Some Children 
 Jules de Jongh as Emily (US) and Some Children (US)
 William Hope as Edward (US), Toby (US), Rocky, (US), and Farmer McColl (US)
 Rob Rackstraw as James (UK/US), Toby (UK) (US only), Owen, the Troublesome Trucks, the Thin Clergyman, Professor Friedrich, Bernie, Headkeeper Jack, Fergus Duncan, The Announcer, and some Passengers
 Glenn Wrage as Cranky (US)
 David Bedella as Victor (UK/US)
 Tim Bain as Aiden and The Australian Bus
 Togo Igawa as Hiro
 Christopher Ragland as Percy (US)
 Tina Desai as Ashima 
 Steven Kynman as Peter Sam and Farmer Willie
 Nigel Pilkington as Percy (UK) 
 Lucy Montgomery as Marion and Carly
 Mike Grady as Sir Robert Norramby
 Colin McFarlane as Bulgy, Beresford, and Dr. Holyfield
 Bob Golding as Baz
 Matt McCooey as Kenji
 Jamie Campbell Bower as Skiff
 Tim Whitnall as Reg
 Joe Swash as Sonny
 Shane Jacobson as Shane
 Sanjeev Bhaskar as Shankar, the Indian Announcer, and the Indian Judge
 Sheena Bhattessa as Noor Jehan, the Indian Troublesome Trucks, and Charubala
 Dominique Moore as Ruth
 Genevieve McCarthy as Aubrey
 Rachael Miller as Rebecca, Prince Charles, Some Children, Little Thomas, and Dr. Hetty 
 Harriet Kershaw as Cleo 
 Yvonne Grundy as Nia
 Tracy-Ann Oberman as Daisy
 Matt Wilkinson as Ben, Cranky (UK), Rocky (UK), Farmer McColl (UK), Rusty, and Merrick
 Rasmus Hardiker as Bill and Philip
 Nicola Stapleton as Rosie
 Maggie Ollerenshaw as Henrietta
 Siu-see Hung as Dr. Kim
 Windson Liong as Lei
 Chris Lew Kum Hoi as Yong Bao and the Mean Engines
 Rose Robinson as Tamika and the Crowd
 Rosamund Pike as Duchess
 Dan Li as the Chinese Railway Inspector
 Nikhil Parnar as Rajiv and the Indian Troublesome Trucks
 Flaminia Cinque as Ester 
 Anna Francolini as Gina
 Montserrat Lombard as Mia 
 Vincenzo Nicoli as Lorenzo and Beppe
 Peter Andre as Ace
 Sharon Miller as Queen Elizabeth II

Episodes

References

Thomas & Friends seasons
2020 British television seasons
2021 British television seasons